The 1077th Anti-aircraft Regiment (1077-y zenith artillerymen Polk) under Colonel Raiynin, was a unit of the Stalingrad Corps Region of the Soviet Air Defense Forces that fought during the Battle of Stalingrad in 1942. The Stalingrad Corps Region was part of the Stalingrad Military District and later subordinated to the Stalingrad Front during the battle for the city. The regiment, like many of the anti-aircraft units, was made up almost entirely of teenage female volunteers barely out of high school. They are most known for their bravery in the defense of the city of Stalingrad (now Volgograd), when they engaged an advancing Panzer unit by setting their guns to the lowest elevation and firing them directly at the advancing tanks.

Training and materials 
English-language sources about this unit are sparse and contradictory. What seems clear is that, like most of the anti-aircraft units, they were poorly trained and under-supplied with ammunition. They may not have had armour piercing rounds, but rather fragmentation 'flak' rounds, and it is questionable how effective these would have been against armour. The guns used were M1939 guns which were 37mm copies of the Bofors.

The Defense of Stalingrad 
On August 23, 1942, the German 6th Army launched its offensive on Stalingrad. After extensive bombing, which turned much of the city into an inferno, the 16th Panzer Division advanced unresistant until it reached Gumrak airport, 15km north-west of the city, where the tanks came under fire from anti-aircraft guns.

The 16th Panzer Division recorded that "right until afternoon we had to fight 'shot for shot' against 37 anti-aircraft positions manned by tenacious fighting women, until all were destroyed."

The official Soviet history of the war also makes mention of this action:

"The anti-aircraft troops first engaged the Panzers on August 23rd on the northern outskirts of the city. An attack from this quarter by the enemy had been unexpected, and so there were no rifle units in position to assist the batteries of the 1077th Anti-Aircraft Regiment in their defense against the strong concentration of German tanks and motorized infantry. Under the command of Colonel W. S. German, for two days the regiment fought alone and repelled the assaults of German sub-machine gunners. During the combat, the regiment destroyed or damaged 83 tanks and 15 other vehicles carrying infantry, destroyed or dispersed over three battalions of assault infantry, and shot down 14 aircraft."

The 1077th Anti-Aircraft Regiment remained in service with the Soviet forces to the end of the war. In May 1945, the regiment was part of the 86th Air Defense Forces Division, itself subordinated to the Southwestern Front. In 1945, the 86th Division was charged with air defense support for the Kharkov and Odessa Military Regions, and also for the Independent Coastal Army.

Notes

References 

 Beevor, Antony (1999). Stalingrad (in English). Viking Press, Penguin Books.  (Pbk).
 Gretschko, A. A., et al. (1975). Geschichte des Zweiten Welt Krieges 1939-1945 (German translation of the official Soviet history of the Second World War), Volume 5, page 216. Berlin: Militärverlag der DDR.
 Stalingrad 1942

External links
 1077th AA Regiment: The Women Who Defended The Stalingrad Tractor Factory Against German Panzers

Regiments of the Soviet Union
 
All-female military units and formations
Artillery units and formations of the Soviet Union
Air defence units and formations of the Soviet Union